Rabbani may refer to:

People
 Rabbani (Sufism), a follower in Sufism
 Abdul Al-Rahim Ghulam Rabbani (born 1969), Pakistani prisoner, brother of Mohammed Ahmad Ghulam Rabbani
 Burhanuddin Rabbani (1940–2011), former President of Afghanistan, leader of the Northern Alliance
 Faraz Rabbani (born 1974), Canadian Muslim scholar
 Hina Rabbani Khar (born 1977), Pakistani politician
 Mohammad Rabbani (1955–2001), Taliban Prime Minister of Afghanistan
 Raza Rabbani (born 1953), Pakistani senator, leader of the opposition
 Mohammed Ahmad Ghulam Rabbani (born 1970), Pakistani prisoner, brother of Abdul Al-Rahim Ghulam Rabbani
 Wahid Baksh Sial Rabbani, Sufi saint
 Mouin Rabbani, Palestinian journalist
 Md Golam Rabbani, Airman at Bangladesh Air Force

Groups
 Rabbani (band), Malaysian nasyid group
 Jama'at-e Rabbani, Iranian branch of the Assemblies of God